Romain Seigle (born 11 October 1994 in Vienne, Isère) is a French cyclist, who last rode for UCI WorldTeam . In August 2019, he was named in the startlist for the 2019 Vuelta a España.

Major results

Road

2017
 3rd Overall Circuit des Ardennes
 10th Overall Tour des Pays de Savoie
2018
 2nd Overall Boucles de la Mayenne
2020
 8th Brussels Cycling Classic

Grand Tour general classification results timeline

Cyclo-cross
2011–2012
 2nd National Junior Championships
 3rd Overall UCI Junior World Cup
 3rd  UEC European Junior Championships
2014–2015
 2nd Overall Coupe de France de cyclo-cross Under-23
1st

Mountain bike
2012
 1st  European Junior XCO Championships
2015
 3rd National Under-23 XCO Championships

References

External links

1994 births
Living people
French male cyclists
Sportspeople from Vienne, Isère
Cyclists from Auvergne-Rhône-Alpes